Luciano De Cecco (born 2 June 1988) is an Argentine professional volleyball player. He is part of the Argentine national team, a bronze medallist at the Olympic Games Tokyo 2020, 2015 Pan American Games winner and the 2018 Italian Champion. At the professional club level, he plays for Cucine Lube Civitanova.

Career

Clubs
In May 2014, he signed a 3-year contract with Sir Safety Perugia.
In the season 2020-2021, he moved to Cucine Lube Civitanova.

National team
He was first appointed to Argentine national team in 2006 before the World League, but he did not play in any match. He began his participation during the World Championship where Argentina took 13th place. His national team won silvers medals at South American Championship in 2007, 2009, 2011, 2013 because four losses to Brazil in the finals. In 2009 and 2011, he was awarded Best Setter of South American Championship. In 2011, he achieved the title of the Best Setter of the World League. On December 4, 2011, he was Best Setter of World Cup. In 2015, De Cecco won the gold medal at the 2015 Pan American Games.

Sporting achievements

Clubs
 CEV Champions League
  2016/2017 – with Sir Sicoma Colussi Perugia

 CSV South American Club Championship
  Argentina 2010 – with Bolívar Voley

 CEV Challenge Cup
  2012/2013 – with Copra Elior Piacenza

 FIVB Club World Championship
  Brazil 2021 – with Cucine Lube Civitanova

 National championships
 2006/2007  Argentine Cup, with Bolívar Voley
 2006/2007  Argentine Championship, with Bolívar Voley
 2013/2014  Italian Cup, with Copra Elior Piacenza
 2017/2018  Italian SuperCup, with Sir Safety Perugia
 2017/2018  Italian Cup, with Sir Safety Perugia
 2017/2018  Italian Championship, with Sir Safety Perugia
 2018/2019  Italian Cup, with Sir Safety Perugia
 2019/2020  Italian SuperCup, with Sir Safety Perugia
 2020/2021  Italian Cup, with Cucine Lube Civitanova

Individual awards
 2009: CSV South American Championship – Best Setter
 2010: CSV South American Club Championship – Best Setter
 2010: CSV South American Club Championship – Most Valuable Player
 2010: FIVB Club World Championship – Best Server
 2011: CSV South American Championship – Best Setter
 2011: FIVB World League – Best Setter
 2011: FIVB World Cup – Best Setter
 2013: CEV Challenge Cup – Most Valuable Player
 2015: Pan American Games – Best Setter
 2017: CEV Champions League – Best Setter
 2021: Olympic Games – Best Setter

References

External links

 The Cecco 15
 
 Player profile at LegaVolley.it 
 Player profile at Volleybox.net
 
 

1988 births
Living people
Sportspeople from Santa Fe, Argentina
Argentine men's volleyball players
Argentine Champions of men's volleyball
Olympic volleyball players of Argentina
Volleyball players at the 2012 Summer Olympics
Volleyball players at the 2016 Summer Olympics
Volleyball players at the 2020 Summer Olympics
Medalists at the 2020 Summer Olympics
Olympic medalists in volleyball
Olympic bronze medalists for Argentina
Pan American Games medalists in volleyball
Pan American Games gold medalists for Argentina
Volleyball players at the 2007 Pan American Games
Volleyball players at the 2015 Pan American Games
Medalists at the 2015 Pan American Games
Argentine expatriate sportspeople in Italy
Expatriate volleyball players in Italy
Argentine expatriate sportspeople in Russia
Expatriate volleyball players in Russia
Setters (volleyball)